Irrelevant is the second album by the Canadian hard rock band Slik Toxik. The album was released in 1994. "Twenty Something" and "Dive" were released as singles.
The album was recorded at Toronto Studio Phase One.

Track listing
"Twenty Something"
"Kill the Pain"
"Voodoo"
"Drained"
"I Wanna Gun"
"Liquid Calm"
"Fashioned After None"
"Dive"
"Blue Monday"
"EMI"
"Mother Machine"
"Just Fade Away"

Band members
 Nick Walsh – vocals
 Rob Bruce – guitar
 Kevin Gale – guitar
 Adam Headland – bass
 Neal Busby – drums

1994 albums
Slik Toxik albums